Harold Solomon was the defending champion but did not compete that year.

Brian Gottfried won in the final 4–6, 6–3, 6–1, 7–6 against Adriano Panatta.

Seeds
A champion seed is indicated in bold text while text in italics indicates the round in which that seed was eliminated.

  Brian Gottfried (champion)
  Yannick Noah (second round)
  Corrado Barazzutti (second round, retired)
  Adriano Panatta (final)
  Pascal Portes (quarterfinals)
  Paul Kronk (semifinals)
  Mark Cox (quarterfinals)
  Jean-François Caujolle (second round)

Draw

 NB: The Final was the best of 5 sets while all other rounds were the best of 3 sets.

Final

Section 1

Section 2

External links
 1980 Paris Open draw

Singles